Weiser is a city in the rural western part of the U.S. state of Idaho and the county seat of Washington County.  With its mild climate, the city supports farm, orchard, and livestock endeavors in the vicinity. The city sits at the confluence of the Weiser River with the great Snake River, which marks the border with Oregon.  The population was 5,507 at the 2010 census.

History
The city was named after the nearby Weiser River, but exactly who that was named for is not precisely known. In one version it is for Peter M. Weiser, a soldier and member of the Lewis and Clark Expedition of 1804–1806.  Another has it for Jacob Weiser, a trapper-turned-miner who struck it rich in Baboon Gulch in the Florence Basin of Idaho in 1861. 
 
William Logan and his wife Nancy were the first white settlers in the vicinity of Weiser in 1863 building a roadhouse in anticipation of the opening of Olds Ferry west of them on the Snake River across from Farewell Bend.  In 1863, Reuben Olds acquired a franchise from the Territorial Legislature and began operating Olds Ferry.  Olds ferry business did well (as did Logan's) as it diverted much of the traffic from the old Snake River crossing point at  Old Fort Boise.  Increasing settlement on the Weiser River valley increased Weiser's population.  A post office was established in 1866 as Weiser Ranch. In 1871, it was renamed Weiser.
 
Weiser reached its height of prosperity when a railroad way station was established and it became a transportation hub for travelers.  Its history is well represented by the great number of original buildings from the 1890s and early 1900s that are on the National Register of Historic Places.

During the 1890s, the city had pretensions of becoming a major regional market and transportation center.  The Idaho Northern Railroad was built up the Weiser River with the intention of reaching Lewiston and river transportation to the ocean.  The dream ended among the lumber mills of central Idaho almost at the community of Meadows... not needing to actually go past the stock loading and lumber ponds outside the village, the terminus station was built there and a new city, New Meadows, came into being.  Likewise the Union Pacific, after taking over the Oregon Short Line chose not to locate its major section yards in the flats west of Weiser—probably due to inflated prices asked by land speculators—and built at Huntington, Oregon at the western edge of the Snake River valley.

Hall of Fame pitcher Walter Johnson played semi-pro baseball for the Weiser Kids as a young man in 1906–1907.  After high school in Fullerton, California, the "Big Train" was lured to Weiser to play baseball and work for the local telephone company.  While in Weiser, he once pitched 84 consecutive scoreless innings.  His skills drew the attention of the Washington Nationals, who sent scout Cliff Blankenship to offer Johnson a contract, and in July 1907 he departed Idaho for the major leagues at age nineteen.

U.S. Route 95 runs through the city, connecting to Oregon and British Columbia.

Culture
Weiser bills itself as the "Fiddling Capital of the World" and the National Oldtime Fiddlers' Contest has been held each year since 1953.  Fiddling contests have been held in Weiser since 1914, but the present festival was the idea of Blaine Stubblefield, a fiddler and folk music collector, and the head of the city's chamber of commerce.  The festival is held at the beginning of summer, during the third full week in June, the only exception occurring during leap years when it is held on the 4th week of the month.  It draws national media coverage and over 7,000 people to the Weiser area.

The city has been consistently served by the Weiser Signal-American, the local weekly newspaper.

For many years Weiser's location as the last city upriver from  Hells Canyon made it the jump-off point for wilderness tours by powered rubber raft down the gorge.  Enormous sturgeon and plentiful salmon were a draw for anglers.  The salmon runs ended not long after the float tours with the blocking of the river by three hydro-power dams built by Idaho Power Company starting in the 1950s.

Geography

Unincorporated Annex, Oregon, sits across the Snake River.

Climate
Weiser experiences a semi-arid climate (Köppen BSk) with cold winters and hot, dry summers.

Demographics

2020 census
Note: the US Census treats Hispanic/Latino as an ethnic category. This table excludes Latinos from the racial categories and assigns them to a separate category. Hispanics/Latinos can be of any race.

As of the 2020 United States census, there were 5,630 people, 2,101 households, and 1,349 families residing in the city.

2010 census
As of the census of 2010, there were 5,507 people, 2,158 households, and 1,396 families residing in the city. The racial makeup of the city was 80.8% White, 0.3% African American, 0.9% Native American, 1.0% Asian, 14.3% from other races, and 2.7% from two or more races. Hispanic or Latino of any race were 26.1% of the population.

There were 2,158 households, of which 33.4% had children under the age of 18 living with them, 46.2% were married couples living together, 13.2% had a female householder with no husband present, 5.3% had a male householder with no wife present, and 35.3% were non-families. 30.2% of all households were made up of individuals, and 15.6% had someone living alone who was 65 years of age or older. The average household size was 2.50 and the average family size was 3.11.

The median age in the city was 38.7 years. 26.4% of residents were under the age of 18; 7.8% were between the ages of 18 and 24; 22.7% were from 25 to 44; 24.3% were from 45 to 64; and 18.7% were 65 years of age or older. The gender makeup of the city was 48.4% male and 51.6% female.

2000 census
As of the census of 2000, there were 5,343 people, 2,018 households, and 1,368 families residing in the city. The racial makeup of the city was 81.13% White, 0.07% African American, 0.80% Native American, 1.20% Asian, 0.13% Pacific Islander, 13.92% from other races, and 2.73% from two or more races. Hispanic or Latino of any race were 22.91% of the population.

There were 2,018 households, out of which 33.4% had children under the age of 18 living with them, 52.4% were married couples living together, 11.2% had a female householder with no husband present, and 32.2% were non-families. 28.0% of all households were made up of individuals, and 17.0% had someone living alone who was 65 years of age or older.  The average household size was 2.58 and the average family size was 3.19.

In the city, the age distribution of the population shows 28.3% under the age of 18, 9.2% from 18 to 24, 24.1% from 25 to 44, 19.9% from 45 to 64, and 18.5% who were 65 years of age or older.  The median age was 36 years. For every 100 females, there were 90.8 males.  For every 100 females age 18 and over, there were 86.6 males.

The median income for a household in the city was $26,880, and the median income for a family was $31,996. Males had a median income of $26,643 versus $16,386 for females. The per capita income for the city was $13,986.  About 12.6% of families and 15.4% of the population were below the poverty line, including 17.9% of those under age 18 and 10.8% of those age 65 or over.

School System 
The Weiser school district consists of Pioneer Elementary School, Kindergarten, 1st, 2nd, and 3rd grades , Park Intermediate School, 4th and 5th grade, Weiser Middle School, 6th, 7th, and 8th grade, and Weiser High School, 9th, 10th, 11th, and 12th grades. The Weiser school system treats students fairly and has a great overall education. The middle and high schools have electives such as band, choir, home economics, health, physical education, drivers education, wood shop, metal shop, etc. The current superintendent, Wade Wilson, removed the mask mandate on October 14th, 2021. Students are still required to social distance during school hours and on school property. This year, the WMS High School marching band won the D3 competition, for the A3 section, by over 3 points. Weiser won in the following categories, guard, percussion, music, and visual. Weiser came in first, Payette second, and Homedale came in third. Twice every month, there is an assembly for the 7th grade about turning into a teen. The Weiser School District has a free lunch program due to Covid-19. There is also a small building on campus of Pioneer Primary School, this building is a WICAP preschool.

Notable people
 Roger Batzel, Director (1971–1988) of Lawrence Livermore National Laboratory
 George Donart, Democratic nominee for U.S. Senator in 1946
Bob Martyn, baseball player
 Harold Ryan – U.S. District Judge – District of Idaho (1981–1995)
Kevin Sharp, country singer
Blaine Stubblefield, country singer, poet
Herman Welker, U.S. Senator from Idaho (1951–57) 
Tim Wrightman, Super Bowl XX Champion as a member of the 1985 Chicago Bears
M. C. Richards, poet, potter, educator

References

Further reading
Conley, Cort.  Idaho for the Curious.  Cambridge: Backeddy, 1982, 552–564.

External links
 National Oldtime Fiddlers' Contest and Festival
  TopoQuest: USGS Map Name:  Olds Ferry, ID, Olds Ferry (site), Idaho

 
Cities in Washington County, Idaho
Cities in Idaho
County seats in Idaho